Growth factor receptor-bound protein 7, also known as GRB7, is a protein that in humans is encoded by the GRB7 gene.

Function 

The product of this gene belongs to a small family of adaptor proteins that are known to interact with a number of receptor tyrosine kinases and signaling molecules. This gene encodes a growth factor receptor-binding protein that interacts with epidermal growth factor receptor (EGFR) and ephrin receptors. The protein plays a role in the integrin signaling pathway and cell migration by binding with focal adhesion kinase (FAK). Alternative splicing results in multiple transcript variants encoding different isoforms, although the full-length natures of only two of the variants have been determined to date.

Clinical significance 

GRB7 is an SH2-domain adaptor protein that binds to receptor tyrosine kinases and provides the intra-cellular direct link to the Ras proto-oncogene.
Human GRB7 is located on the long arm of chromosome 17, next to the ERBB2 (alias HER2/neu) proto-oncogene.

These two genes are commonly co-amplified (present in excess copies) in breast cancers.
GRB7, thought to be involved in migration , is well known to be over-expressed in testicular germ cell tumors, esophageal cancers, and gastric cancers.

Interactions 

GRB7 has been shown to interact with:

 EPH receptor B1,
 Insulin receptor, 
 PTK2, 
 RET proto-oncogene,  and
 Rnd1

Model organisms 

Model organisms have been used in the study of GRB7 function. A conditional knockout mouse line called Grb7tm1b(EUCOMM)Wtsi was generated at the Wellcome Trust Sanger Institute. Male and female animals underwent a standardized phenotypic screen to determine the effects of deletion. Additional screens performed:  - In-depth immunological phenotyping

References

Further reading

External links 
 

Proteins